Pitane napravniki is a moth in the family Erebidae first described by Juan Grados in 2004. It is found in southern Peru.

References

Phaegopterina
Moths described in 2004